The white-striped forest rail (Rallicula leucospila) is a species of bird in the family Sarothruridae.  It is endemic to West Papua, Indonesia.  Its natural habitat is subtropical or tropical moist montane forests.  It is threatened by habitat loss.

References

Rallicula
Birds of West Papua
Birds described in 1875
Taxonomy articles created by Polbot